Sarah Tamura (born January 21, 2001) is a Canadian figure skater. She is the 2016 Canadian national junior champion and has qualified to the free skate at two World Junior Championships.

Career 
Tamura began learning to skate in 2005. She is coached by Joanne McLeod at Champs International Skating Center in Burnaby, British Columbia.

After winning the 2016 Canadian national junior title, she was sent to the 2016 World Junior Championships in Debrecen, Hungary. Ranked 16th after the short program, she qualified to the free skate and went on to finish 13th overall.

Tamura advanced to the free skate at the 2017 World Junior Championships in Taipei, Taiwan.

Programs

Competitive highlights 
CS: Challenger Series; JGP: Junior Grand Prix

References

External links 
 

2001 births
Canadian female single skaters
Living people
Figure skaters from Vancouver